The Colonials Club House, also known as the Beta Deuteron Charge House of Theta Delta Chi, is a historic building located in Ames, Iowa, United States. The significance of this building is its role in the development of the city's Fourth Ward. Prior to its construction in 1910, off campus student housing was clustered on the west side of the Iowa State College (now Iowa State University campus. This building opened up the southeast side of the campus, and it became the preferred location for new fraternity and sorority residences. It was also a change in how those residences were designed. Prior fraternity and sorority houses in Ames were frame, vernacular, single-family dwellings. Designed by the Des Moines architectural firm of Proudfoot & Bird, this 2½-brick structure features the Colonial Revival style, which became one of the prominent styles for fraternity and sorority houses associated with the university.

The original main block of the building was built for a local fraternity “The Colonials” (or the “Colonial Club”). In 1920 they became a local chapter of the national fraternity Theta Delta Chi, and the building was expanded. Another addition was constructed in 1966. It was designed by the Des Moines architectural firm of Woodburn & O’Neil. The building was listed on the National Register of Historic Places in 2012.

References

Houses completed in 1910
Fraternity and sorority houses
Colonial Revival architecture in Iowa
Buildings and structures in Ames, Iowa
National Register of Historic Places in Story County, Iowa
Residential buildings on the National Register of Historic Places in Iowa